John Ruthven, 3rd Earl of Gowrie (c. 1577 – 5 August 1600), was a Scottish nobleman who died in mysterious circumstances, referred to as the "Gowrie Conspiracy", in which he and/or his brother Alexander were attempting to kill or kidnap King James VI of Scotland for unknown purposes. The king's retinue killed both brothers during the attack, and the king survived.

Early life
John Ruthven was the second son of William Ruthven, 1st Earl of Gowrie, and his wife Dorothea Stewart. His brother James, the 2nd Earl, died in 1586, therefore John succeeded his brother as the Earl of Gowrie while still a child.

The Ruthven family had a history of treason. Like his father and grandfather before him, Ruthven attached himself to the party of the reforming preachers, who procured his election in 1592 as Provost of Perth, a post that was almost hereditary in the Ruthven family. He was educated at the grammar school of Perth and the University of Edinburgh, where he was in the summer of 1593, about the time when his mother, and his sister the Countess of Atholl, aided the Earl of Bothwell in forcing himself, sword in hand, into the king's bedchamber in Holyrood Palace.

A few months later Ruthven joined with earls of Atholl and Montrose in offering to serve Queen Elizabeth I of England, then almost openly hostile to the Scottish king; and it is probable that he had also relations with the rebellious Bothwell. He travelled to Italy in 1597 with his tutor, William Rhynd, and they enrolled at the University of Padua in April. On his way home in 1599 he remained for some months at Geneva with the reformer Theodore Beza.

At Paris, he made acquaintance with the English ambassador, Henry Neville, who reported him to Robert Cecil as devoted to Elizabeth's service on 27 February 1599. Neville wrote that Ruthven would like to kiss Queen Elizabeth's hand, and said the Earl was loyal to the Protestant religion and the English queen. Gowrie would be able to give Cecil useful information regarding potential feared "alterations" in the political state of Scotland. In London he was received very favourably by Queen Elizabeth and her ministers.

In February 1600 he encountered William Stewart of Houston in a long gallery or passage in Holyrood Palace. Stewart had arrested the earl's father in 1584. The earl made to move out of Stewart's way then reconsidered at the urging of his servant Thomas Kinrosser. Stewart noted this and complained to the king as an offence to his long service and dignity, warning that Gowrie was a threat to the court. Gowrie was told about this, and said "Aquila non captat muscus", meaning the eagle does not catch flies, that Stewart was beneath his attention.

The "Gowrie conspiracy" resulted in the killing of the earl and his brother by attendants of King James at Gowrie House, Perth, a few weeks after Ruthven's return to Scotland in May 1600.

Gowrie House stood just inside Perth's town wall, next to the River Tay on the site now occupied by Perth Sheriff Court at the junction of Canal Street and Tay Street.

Gowrie conspiracy
The Gowrie conspiracy or Gowrie Plot was a series of events unfolding on 5 August 1600. It is shrouded in mystery. Although the facts of the actual attack and deaths of the Ruthvens are known, the circumstances by which that sequence of events came about remain a mystery.

Ruthven had reason to seek vengeance on James VI as he had executed his father in response to the Ruthven Raid, which in turn was inspired by high debts of the King to the Ruthven family. Getting rid of the family got rid of the debts, especially if the family was stripped of all ownership for reason of "treason".

Events

As he set out, accompanied by Ludovic Stewart (the Duke of Lennox), John Erskine (the Earl of Mar), Thomas Erskine (the Earl of Kellie, first cousin to John) and others, he was approached by twenty-year-old Alexander Ruthven, a younger brother of John Ruthven. Alexander advised the king that he and his brother had detained a foreigner carrying a large quantity of money at Gowrie House in Perth, and urged James to interrogate the man himself. The king initially hesitated but ultimately agreed to ride to Perth after the hunt ended. Alexander Ruthven dispatched a servant, Henderson, to inform his brother that the king would be arriving at Gowrie House later in the day. Alexander then urged the king to lose no time, demanding that he keep the matter secret from his courtiers, and that he bring as small a retinue as possible to Gowrie House.

James, in the company of ten to fifteen retainers, arrived at Gowrie House around one o'clock in the afternoon. Despite having received word earlier that the king would be arriving, Ruthven had made no preparations, thus giving the impression of having been taken by surprise. After a small meal, for which he was kept waiting an hour, King James, forbidding most of his retainers to follow him, went with Alexander up the main staircase and passed through two chambers and two doors, both of which Ruthven locked behind them, into a turret-room at the angle of the house, with windows looking on the courtyard and the street. Here James expected to find the mysterious prisoner with the foreign gold, but was instead threatened with bodily harm. He found an armed man, who was actually Gowrie's servant, Henderson. Alexander immediately put on his hat and, drawing Henderson's dagger, presented it to the king's breast with threats of instant death if James opened a window or called for help. An allusion by Alexander to the execution of his father, the 1st Earl of Gowrie, drew from James a reproof of Alexander's ingratitude for various benefits conferred on his family. Alexander then uncovered his head, declaring that James's life should be safe if he remained quiet; then, committing the king to the custody of Henderson, he left the turret—ostensibly to consult with his brother—and locked the door behind him.

While Alexander was absent the king questioned Henderson, who professed ignorance of any plot and of the purpose for which he had been placed in the turret. At James's request, Henderson opened one of the windows and was about to open the other when Alexander returned. Whether or not Alexander had actually been to see his brother is uncertain. Ruthven had meantime spread news below that the king had taken horse and ridden away, and the royal retinue were seeking their horses to follow him.

Alexander, on re-entering the turret, attempted to bind James's hands. A struggle ensued, in the course of which the king was seen at the window by some of his followers below in the street, who also heard him cry "treason" and call for help to the Earl of Mar. Ruthven pretended not to hear these cries, but kept asking what was the matter. Lennox, Mar and most of the other lords and gentlemen ran up the main staircase to help the king, but were stopped by the locked door, which they spent some time trying to batter down.

John Ramsay (afterwards the Earl of Holdernesse), noticing a small, dark stairway leading directly to the inner chamber adjoining the turret, ran up it and the door was then unlocked by Henderson. There he found the king struggling with Alexander. Drawing his dagger, Ramsay wounded Alexander, who was then pushed down the stairway past the king. Thomas Erskine, summoned by Ramsay, now followed up the small stairs with Dr Hugh Herries, and the two killed Alexander with their swords. John Ruthven, entering the courtyard with his stabler Thomas Cranstoun and seeing his brother's body, rushed up the staircase after Erskine and Herries, followed by Cranstoun. In the melée he was also killed. Some commotion was caused in the town by the noise of these proceedings but it quickly subsided, though the king did not deem it safe to return to Falkland Palace for some hours.

Theories
Three scenarios have been proposed to explain the events:
 that Ruthven and his brother concocted a plot to murder or, more probably, kidnap King James and that they lured him to Gowrie House for this purpose;
 that James paid a surprise visit to Gowrie House with the intention of killing the two Ruthvens;
 that the tragedy was the outcome of an unplanned brawl which followed an argument between the King and one of the Ruthvens.
 additionally, it has been suggested that Anne of Denmark was complicit in the plot.

To understand the relative probabilities of these hypotheses, regard must be paid to the condition of Scotland in 1600.
Plots to capture the sovereign for the purpose of coercing his actions were frequent, more than one had been successful, and the Ruthven family had taken an active part in several of them.
Relations between England and Scotland were more than usually strained, and the Earl of Gowrie was reckoned in London among the adherents of Elizabeth. The Kirk party, being at variance with James, looked upon Gowrie as a hereditary partisan of their cause, and had recently sent an agent to Paris to recall him to Scotland as their leader.
Gowrie was believed to be James's rival for the succession to the English crown. As regards the question of motive, the Ruthvens believed their father to have been killed in treachery, and his widow insulted by the king's favourite minister.
James owed a large sum of money to the Earl of Gowrie's estate, and popular gossip credited either Ruthven with being the lover of the queen.

Although the evidence on these points, and on every circumstance connected with the event itself, has been examined by historians of the Gowrie conspiracy, the mystery has never been entirely dispelled. The two most recent studies subscribe to the kidnap theory.  Arbuckle's study of 1957 favours the kidnapping that went wrong, while Maurice Lee proposes that James went to Gowrie House believing Ruthven was a conduit for political intelligence from London (that the pot of gold was a flimsy cover story), and when he arrived with an unexpectedly large retinue, Alexander realised that a successful kidnapping was not possible and attempted to take the King's life to avenge his father's death.

Most modern research, in the light of materials inaccessible or overlooked until the 20th century, points to the conclusion that there was a conspiracy by Ruthven and his brother to kidnap the king. If this is true, it follows that the second theory, that James went to Gowrie House to specifically kill the Ruthvens, is invalid and that his own account of the occurrence, in spite of the glaring improbabilities which it involved, was substantially true.

Aftermath
The events at Gowrie House caused intense excitement throughout Scotland. The investigation of the circumstances was also followed with much interest in England where all the details were reported to Elizabeth's ministers. The ministers of the Kirk, whose influence in Scotland was too extensive for the king to neglect, were persuaded, but with great difficulty, to accept James's account of the occurrence. He voluntarily submitted himself to cross-examination by one of their number.

The ministers' belief, and that of their partisans, no doubt influenced by political hostility toward James, was that the king had invented the story of a conspiracy by Gowrie to cover his own design to extirpate the Ruthven family. James gave some colour to this belief, which has not been entirely abandoned, by the relentless severity with which he pursued the two younger, and unquestionably innocent, brothers of the earl. A more tangible motive for mutual discontent is to be found in the fact that the king was Gowrie's debtor to the extent of no less than £80,000 representing a sum of £48,063 due to his father while treasurer, with the interest at 10% per annum for the succeeding years. With this sum the old Earl of Gowrie, when treasurer, was forced to burden himself in order to meet the current expenses of the government. It was probably his inability to meet the obligations incurred by his father that had compelled the young earl to remain abroad; and on his return he presented a petition to the court of session, stating that he was unfit to pay any more to his creditors than he had done already, and asking to be relieved of these royal debts. In answer to his application he on 20 June 1600 obtained a protection from debt for a year.

Great efforts were made by the government to prove the complicity of others in the plot. One noted and dissolute conspirator, Sir Robert Logan of Restalrig, was posthumously convicted of having been privy to the Gowrie conspiracy on the evidence of certain letters produced by a notary, George Sprot, who swore they had been written by Logan to Gowrie and others. These letters, which are still in existence, were in fact forged by Sprot in imitation of Logan's handwriting; but the researches of Andrew Lang have shown cause for suspecting that the most important of them was either copied by Sprot from a genuine original by Logan, or that it embodied the substance of such a letter. If this is correct, it would appear that the conveyance of the king to Fast Castle, Logan's impregnable fortress on the coast of Berwickshire, was part of the plot; and it supplies, in all events, an additional piece of evidence to prove the genuineness of the Gowrie conspiracy.  Robert Logan died before May 1608 the last of his line; George Sprot was hanged at the Market Cross of Edinburgh for foreknowledge of the conspiracy on 12 August 1608.

On 7 August 1600, James's Privy Council of Scotland ordered that the corpses of Gowrie and his brother should remain unburied until further decisions were made over the matter, and that no person with the name of Ruthven should approach within ten miles of the court. Orders were also sent for the apprehension of the Earl's brothers William and Patrick, but they fled to England. The bodies of Gowrie and his brother Robert were disembowelled and preserved by one James Melville, who, however, was paid for his services, not by the magistrates of Perth, but by the Privy Council; and on 30 October they were sent to Edinburgh to be produced at the bar of Parliament. On 15 November, the estates of the Ruthvens were discerned by Parliament to be forfeited and their family name and honours extinct.

The corpses of the Earl and his brother were hanged and quartered at the Mercat Cross in Edinburgh on 19 November 1600. Their heads were put on spikes at Edinburgh's Old Tolbooth and their arms and legs upon spikes at various locations around Perth.

Another act was further passed abolishing the name of Ruthven, ordering that the house wherein the tragedy happened should be levelled to the ground, and decreeing that the barony of Ruthven should henceforth be known as the barony of Huntingtower. In a letter of November 1600, the Patrick Gray, 6th Lord Gray described the aftermath of the Gowrie Conspiracy. The Ruthven family were ordered to change their surname, and the House of Ruthven near Perth was renamed as Huntingtower. Some suspicion had fallen on Anne of Denmark, and some courtiers would be removed from her household after the birth of her child (Prince Charles). Despite her protests, her enemy, Sir Thomas Erskine, would be made captain of the royal guard.

Family
Ruthven's two younger brothers, William and Patrick, fled to England.The brothers went to Berwick-upon-Tweed and lived in hiding for a month, until the marshal of the town Sir John Carey helped them travel to Durham and Cambridge.

William Ruthven died in France prior to 1622

After the 1603 accession of James to the English throne, it was reported that one of the brothers was captured at an inn at Kirkby Malzeard near Ripon, by Francis Wandesford who had seen him three years earlier at Durham. Wandesford delivered him to Sir William Ingleby of Ripley Castle. It was thought that Patrick Ruthven was captured in London in June 1603, but the mayor Robert Lee discovered this was a case of mistaken identity. Later Patrick was captured and imprisoned for nineteen years in the Tower of London. Patrick Ruthven resided first at Cambridge and afterwards in Somersetshire, being granted a small pension by the crown. He married Elizabeth Woodford, widow of Lord Gerrard, by whom he had two sons and a daughter, Mary. The latter entered the service of Queen Henrietta Maria and married the Dutch painter Anthony van Dyck, who painted several portraits of her; after Van Dyck's death, she married Sir Richard Pryse, 1st Baronet of Gogerddan. Patrick died in poverty in a cell in the King's Bench in 1652, being buried as "Lord Ruthven". His son, also named Patrick, presented a petition to Oliver Cromwell in 1656, in which, after reciting that the parliament of Scotland in 1641 had restored his father to the barony of Ruthven, he prayed that his "extreme poverty" might be relieved by the bounty of the Protector.

Sisters Barbara and Beatrix were helped by Anne of Denmark, and Barbara Ruthven went to London. Beatrix (died 1625) married John Home of Cowdenknowes; and they were grandparents of James Home, 3rd Earl of Home.

Notes

References

Citations

Sources

 

Attribution

 Endnotes:

, and the authorities there cited.

External links
 The Gowrie Conspiracy, by Samuel Cowan, available through Internet Archive

John
Provosts in Scotland
16th-century Scottish people
1570s births
1600 deaths
1600 in Scotland
Ruthven family
Alumni of the University of Edinburgh